Warwick Farm railway station is located on the Main South line, serving the Sydney suburb of Warwick Farm. It is served by Sydney Trains T2 Inner West & Leppington, T3 Bankstown and T5 Cumberland line services.

History
The original Warwick Farm station opened on 18 March 1889 as a private platform for William Forrester near the former level crossing on the Hume Highway. It was relocated to its present location in 1943 when nearby Warwick Farm Racecourse was used as a military camp.

Previously, a 1.6-kilometre branch line to the racecourse branched off from the Main South line north of the station, and carried special racecourse trains on race days. The branch opened in June 1889, closed in August 1990 and was removed in December 1991.

The Southern Sydney Freight Line opened immediately to the east of the station in January 2013. As part of its construction, a footbridge with lifts and stairs was constructed. Previously, crossing the railway line required passengers to use the Hume Highway bridge. Platform 2 was very narrow and was widened during the works.

Platforms & services

Transport links
Transdev NSW operates one route via Warwick Farm station:-
904: Fairfield station to Liverpool station

Warwick Farm station is served by one NightRide route:
N50: Liverpool station to Town Hall station

References

External links

Warwick Farm station details Transport for New South Wales

Easy Access railway stations in Sydney
Railway stations in Sydney
Railway stations in Australia opened in 1889
Railway stations in Australia opened in 1943
Main Southern railway line, New South Wales
City of Liverpool (New South Wales)